Oroqen (also known as Orochon, Oronchon, Olunchun, Elunchun or Ulunchun) is a Northern Tungusic language spoken in the People's Republic of China. Dialects are Gankui and Heilongjiang. Gankui is the standard dialect. It is spoken by the Oroqen people of Inner Mongolia (predominantly the Oroqin Autonomous Banner) and Heilongjiang in Northeast China.

Since the 1980s, Oroqen-language materials were produced by teachers in Oroqen-speaking areas. They based the language's orthography either on IPA or Pinyin. A majority of Oroqen speakers use Chinese as a literary language and some also speak Daur.

Geographic distribution
Oroqen is spoken in the following counties of China:
Heilongjiang province
Da Hinggan Ling: Huma County and Tahe County
Heihe: Xunke County
Yichun: Jiayin County and Heihe City
Inner Mongolia Autonomous Region
Hulunbuir: Oroqen Autonomous Banner

Dialects
 Birarchen
 Kumarchen
 Orochen
 Selpechen (in Heilongjiang)
 Gankui (in Inner Mongolia)

The Gankui dialect is used as the standard dialect for the Oroqen language.

Phonology

Consonants 

 Allophones of /x/ are heard as [ɣ], [h].
 A bilabial /ɸ/ can also be heard as a labio-dental [f].
 A rhotic trill /r/ tends to sound as a tap [ɾ], when occurring word-finally.

Vowels 

 /ə, əː/ are often heard as lower sounds [, ].
 Short allophones of /o, u/ are heard as [, ].

Notes

External links
 Oroqen Vocabulary List (from the World Loanword Database)
Oroqen Swadesh vocabulary list of basic words (from Wiktionary's Swadesh list appendix)
 Oroqen alphabet from Omniglot

Agglutinative languages
Languages of China
Tungusic languages
Endangered languages